Thomas Cotton may refer to:

Thomas Cotton (MP for Huntingdonshire) (died 1574), MP for Huntingdonshire
Sir Thomas Cotton, 2nd Baronet, of Connington (1594–1662), English politician
Sir Thomas Cotton, 2nd Baronet, of Combermere (c. 1672–1715), English peer
Thomas Cotton (dissenting minister) (1653–1730), English minister
Thomas A. Cotton, state legislator in Mississippi during the Reconstruction era
Thomas Forrest Cotton (1884–1965), Canadian cardiologist
Tom Cotton (born 1977), US politician

See also
Cotton (disambiguation)